Sagar Shah (born 28 January 1990) is an Indian chess player, journalist, commentator, and YouTuber who holds the title of International Master (IM). He co-founded ChessBase India in late 2015, along with Amruta Mokal. Outside of chess, he is a Chartered Accountant. Shah has a peak FIDE rating of 2468 with two Grandmaster (GM) norms.  He was awarded the Shiv Chhatrapati Award in 2014. In 2020 Shah and famous standup comedian and chess streamer Samay Raina started streaming chess on YouTube. Shah started teaching chess to a group of comedians on stream. The duo have greatly contributed to the chess boom in India.

References

1990 births
Indian chess players
Sportspeople from Mumbai
Living people